Andreas Sandt (born 5 November 1962) is retired a Germany football goalkeeper.

References

External links
 

1962 births
Living people
German footballers
Bundesliga players
FC Schalke 04 players
VfL Bochum II players

Association football goalkeepers